Carla Cristina Ribeiro (born 29 May 1971) is a Portuguese sports shooter. She competed at the 1992 Summer Olympics and the 1996 Summer Olympics.

References

1971 births
Living people
Portuguese female sport shooters
Olympic shooters of Portugal
Shooters at the 1992 Summer Olympics
Shooters at the 1996 Summer Olympics
Sportspeople from Lisbon